Agim Rada (born 24 May 1953, in Tirana) is an Albanian sculptor. His portfolio includes statues sculpted in bronze for such figures as Marin Barleti, Gjergj Elez Alia, Onufri, and Petro Marko. His latest work, the "Chained Cleric", was unveiled in the city of Shkodër days before Pope Francis' visit to Albania.

References

Albanian sculptors
People from Tirana
1953 births
Living people